Action Aboard: Adventures on the King Richard is a 1981 role-playing game adventure for Classic Traveller, written by Bill Paley, with a cover by William H. Keith, and  published by FASA.

Plot summary
Action Aboard: Adventures on the King Richard is a set of character descriptions and stats, along with some situational ideas and scenario outlines, which referees may use to create scenarios for player characters aboard the 5000-ton luxury liner, King Richard.

Publication history
Action Aboard: Adventures on the King Richard was written by Bill Paley, with art by Kevin Siembieda, and was published in 1981 by FASA as a digest-sized 48-page book with a two-color map.

Reception
William A. Barton reviewed Action Aboard: Adventures on the King Richard in The Space Gamer No. 47. Barton commented that "Overall, Action Aboard is quite well done and should provide many hours of adventure for Traveller players who can appreciate several different types of scenarios."

Bob McWilliams reviewed Action Aboard for White Dwarf #31, giving it an overall rating of 5 out of 10 for the novice, and 6 for the expert, and stated that "Well produced and with plenty going on, the designers have provided referees with as much help as can be fitted in booklets of this size, gone into detail at points in the adventure where it's necessary and not filled out with 'chrome'."

Reviews
 Different Worlds #18 (Jan., 1982)

References

Role-playing game supplements introduced in 1981
Traveller (role-playing game) adventures